The Pietroasele Treasure (or the Petrossa Treasure) found in Pietroasele, Buzău, Romania, in 1837, is a late fourth-century Gothic treasure that included some twenty-two objects of gold, among the most famous examples of the polychrome style of Migration Period art. Of the twenty-two pieces, only twelve have survived, conserved at the National Museum of Romanian History, in Bucharest: a large eagle-headed fibula and three smaller ones encrusted with semi-precious stones; a patera, or round sacrificial dish,  modelled with Orphic figures surrounding a seated three-dimensional goddess in the center; a twelve-sided cup, a ring with a Gothic runic inscription, a large tray, two other necklaces and a pitcher. Their multiple styles, in which Han Chinese styles have been noted in the belt buckles, Hellenistic styles in the golden bowls, Sasanian motifs in the baskets, and Germanic fashions in the fibulae, are characteristic of the cosmopolitan outlook of the Cernjachov culture in a region without defined topographic confines.

When Alexandru Odobescu published his book on the treasure, he considered that such magnificent work could only have belonged to Athanaric (died 381), leader of the Thervings, a Gothic people. Modern archaeologists cannot connect the hoard with such a glamorous name.

The treasure was shipped to Russia in December 1916, as German armies advanced through Romania in World War I, and was never fully returned; parts were returned in 1956.

An atomic analysis of the Pietroasele gold hoard has concluded that from the point of view of Ir/Au, Cu/Au and Ag/Au concentrations the three styles are clustered. At least from the iridium concentration data, the assumption of a Dacian provenance of the hoard raw material is highly improbable as also the hypothesis that Roman imperial gold coins were used for manufacturing Pietroasa artifacts is not in accordance with the elemental concentrations.

Old photos show that the head of the largest bird brooch was originally detached, and the present restoration has the head on the wrong way round. In its original state the head would have faced forwards and the brooch would have sat like a bird on the shoulder fastening a cloak in imitation of the Roman fashion.

See also
 Ring of Pietroassa
 Treasure of Osztrópataka
 Romanian Treasure

Notes

External links
Pietroasele treasure, at the National Museum of Romanian History
Illustrations
Coins depicting the treasure
A great gold eagle  brooch 
Vivid: Romania through international eyes, Tim Judy, "The treasure of the Pietroasa" Part I: December 2005 Part II: January 2006

Goths
Germanic archaeological artifacts
Treasure troves of late antiquity
Archaeological discoveries in Romania
Art and cultural repatriation
Pietroasele
1837 archaeological discoveries